Zherdev, Zherdeva is a Russian surname , where 'Жердь' means 'perch'. Notable people with the surname include:

Andrei Zherdev (born 1989), Russian footballer
Gleb Zherdev (born 2000), Belarusian footballer
Nikolay Zherdev (born 1984), Ukrainian-Russian ice hockey player

Russian-language surnames